Hovuslu is a village in the Jabrayil District of Azerbaijan.

History 
The village was occupied by Armenian forces during the First Nagorno-Karabakh war. It was recaptured by Azerbaijan during the 2020 Nagorno-Karabakh war. Azerbaijan Ministry of defence published video footage from the village on 24 December 2020 showing full destruction of the village during the Armenian occupation.

References 

Populated places in Jabrayil District